Groupement Aérien Sénégalais is the governmental airline of Senegal based in Dakar. Its main base is Dakar-Yoff-Léopold Sédar Senghor International Airport.

Fleet

Current fleet
The Groupement Aérien Sénégalais fleet consists of the following aircraft (as of August 2017):

Former fleet
The Groupement Aérien Sénégalais fleet previously included the following aircraft (as of 11 August 2009):

1 Airbus A340-200

References

Airlines of Senegal